Christchurch Boys' High School, often referred to as CBHS, is a single sex state secondary school in Christchurch, New Zealand. It is situated on a  site between the suburbs of Riccarton and Fendalton,  to the west of central Christchurch. The school's colours are deep blue and black with an occasional flash of gold.

History 

Established in 1881, the prime purpose of Christchurch Boys' High School was to prepare students for enrolment into the then newly formed Canterbury College, now known as the University of Canterbury. Consequently, it was initially co-located with the College in downtown Christchurch, at the site of the modern-day Christchurch Arts Centre. As the university and school expanded, the school moved to its present location on Straven Road in 1926. The school's present site was originally a farm owned by Canterbury's pioneer settlers, the Deans, and several buildings from the Deans' farm still stand on the grounds. The school's main building is registered by Heritage New Zealand as a Category I heritage building, with registration number 3658.

Christchurch Boys' High School has a rich sporting and academic history and boasts many traditions. The school has produced many All Blacks, with only Auckland Grammar School having produced more. The school can also lay claim to several famous cricketers. There is a unique ANZAC Day service each year that is compulsory for new students of the school to attend to commemorate the hundreds of Old Boys' that fought and died in the two World Wars. The school song 'Altiora Peto' has a third verse that is only heard on this day. In 2004 CBHS provided 2 of New Zealands 'top scholars', one of only 3 schools to do so with the other two both being girls-only schools in the Auckland region.

Of note is the fierce rivalry Boys' High has with Christ's College and the annual Christ's College/Boys' High rugby match is a major event in any calendar year. This rivalry harks back over a hundred years to when the schools were not only the first two all male schools to be founded in Canterbury, but also conveniently situated within  of each other.

Of late, the school's cultural activities have gained some prominence, in particular its dramatic and musical productions where it often joins forces with its sister school, Christchurch Girls' High School.

Notable alumni

Arts
 Rewi Alley – writer, social reformer
 Brian Brake – photographer
 Allen Curnow – poet
 Alan Duff – writer
 Jason Gunn – radio and television personality
 Sir David Low – cartoonist
 Bill Sutton (1917–2000), artist
 Marlon Williams – musician
 Niel Wright – poet and critic
 James Lucas – writer, film director

Science
Glenn Wilson – psychologist
David J. Lockwood – physicist
Robert McLachlan –  mathematician

Military
 James Burrows – army commander (also an All Black)
 Sir Leonard Monk Isitt – air force leader
 Sir Howard Kippenberger – WWII army commander
 Keith Thiele – WWII pilot
 John Boswell  – Current Chief of the New Zealand Army

Public service 

 Arthur Dobbs – Director-General of Education 1971–1975

Politics
 Bob Bell – former National MP for the  electorate
 Max Bradford – Minister of Defence 1998, former Chief Executive of National Party, Member of Parliament for Tarawera and Rotorua New Zealand Parliament
 Dr Donald Brash – Former leader of both the National Party, the ACT Party, and former Governor of the Reserve Bank of New Zealand.
 George Forbes – Prime Minister of New Zealand from 1930 to 1935, first leader of the National Party
 Bruce Jesson – left-wing activist
 Keith Locke – spokesperson on international affairs, defence and disarmament issues for the last decade (for NewLabour, the Alliance, and now the Green Party)
 Sir Maui Pomare – Māori politician, doctor, reformer
 Tony Steel – former All Black, Headmaster of Hamilton Boys' High School and Member of Parliament
 David Caygill – former Minister of Finance (New Zealand) and Member of Parliament for St. Albans, in Christchurch (New Zealand).

Business
 Charles Luney – builder and company director
 Ian Athfield – architect
 Christopher Luxon – Former CEO of Air New Zealand and Unilever Canada

Sport

Christchurch Boys' High has one of the richest sporting alumni of any school in New Zealand, having produced the Hadlee brothers (cricket) and numerous All Black rugby footballers (46 in total) who have gone on to represent New Zealand with great distinction.

Athletics
 David Ambler – sprinter

Cricket
 Geoff Allott – New Zealand Cricket Team
 Corey Anderson – New Zealand Cricket Team
 Robert Anderson – New Zealand Cricket Team
 Todd Astle – New Zealand Cricket Team
 Chris Cairns – New Zealand Cricket Team
 Lee Germon – Captain New Zealand Cricket Team
 Dayle Hadlee – New Zealand Cricket Team
 Sir Richard Hadlee – New Zealand Cricket Team
 Walter Hadlee – New Zealand Cricket Team
 Blair Hartland – New Zealand Cricket Team
 Llorne Howell – New Zealand Cricket Team
 Tom Latham – New Zealand Cricket Team
 Chris Martin – New Zealand Cricket Team
 Neil Broom – New Zealand Cricket Team
 Alex Ross (cricketer) – Australian Cricket Team

Cycling
Anton Cooper – Commonwealth Games gold medallist 2014, silver medallist 2018
Daniel Whitehouse – road cyclist

Football
 Ben Sigmund – Wellington Phoenix Football Team

Futsal
Atta Elayyan

Hockey  
Cameron Hayde – Black Sticks
George Enersen – Black Sticks
George Connell – Black Sticks
Willy Davidson – Black Sticks
Richard Bain – Black Sticks
Nick Haig – Black Sticks, Olympian
Andrew Hastie – Black Sticks
Selwyn Maister – Black Sticks, Olympic gold medallist 1976
Barry Maister – Black Sticks, Olympic gold medallist 1976
Chris Maister – Black Sticks, Olympic gold medallist 1976 
John Christensen – Black Sticks, Olympic gold medallist 1976
Alan Patterson, NZ 3 times Olympian 1964,1968,1972. The last two as Captain

Lawn bowls
 Gary Lawson – Black Jacks

Rowing
 Jack Lopas – Mens Double Sculls 2020 Olympics
 Alistair Bond – Mens Eight 2016 Olympics

Rugby union
 Geoff Alley – All Black and National Librarian 
 Marty Banks – Highlanders (rugby union) player
 Daniel Carter – All Black
 John Creighton – All Black
 Bob Deans – All Black
 Ash Dixon – Māori All Blacks captain
 Bob Duff – All Black captain, All Black coach and selector
 Ben Franks – All Black
 Owen Franks – All Black
 Daryl Gibson – All Black
 Scott Hamilton – All Black
 Steve Hansen – All Blacks coach, Wales coach
 Sir Graham Henry – All Blacks coach, Wales coach
 David Hewett – All Black
 Fabian Holland - Highlanders
 Andrew Horrell – Waikato Chiefs
 Howard Joseph – All Black
 Anton Lienert-Brown – All Black
 Richard Loe –  All Black
 Aaron Mauger – All Black
 Nathan Mauger – All Black
 Fergie McCormick – All Black
 Andrew Mehrtens – All Black
 James Paterson – USA Eagle
 Brodie Retallick – All Black
 Luke Romano – All Black
 Colin Slade – All Black
 Matt Todd – All Black
 Adam Thomson – All Black
 Patrick Vincent – All Black captain
 Kosei Ono – Japan national rugby union team
 Tony Steel – All Black
 Nasi Manu – Tonga national rugby union team
 Rodney Ah You – Ireland national rugby union team
 Will Jordan – All Black

Rallying
Jeff Judd – 2009 Pirelli Star Co-Driver, 2011 PWRC Competitor, 2010 Silver Fern Rally Winner

Snowsports
 Jamie Prebble – Ski Cross silver medallist at the FIS Freestyle Ski and Snowboarding World Championships 2017, competed in Ski Cross at the 2018 Winter Olympics
 Carlos Garcia Knight – Competed in snowboard Slopestyle and Big Air at the 2018 Winter Olympics

Speedway
 Ivan Mauger, OBE, MBE – Six time Speedway World Champion

Squash
 Paul Coll – Current Squash World #1

MMA
  Brad Riddell (fighter) – UFC Lightweight

See also 
High School Old Boys RFC

Notes

References

External links 
 Official Christchurch Boys' High School website
 Adams House Boarding Hostel
 Christchurch Boys' HS Rugby Club Official Website
 Education Review Office (ERO) reports

Boarding schools in New Zealand
Boys' schools in New Zealand
Educational institutions established in 1881
Secondary schools in Christchurch
Heritage New Zealand Category 1 historic places in Canterbury, New Zealand
1881 establishments in New Zealand
1880s architecture in New Zealand